Dzianis Hancharonak (born June 21, 1988), sometimes spelt Denis Goncheronok, is a Belarusian heavyweight Muay Thai kickboxer fighting out of Minsk for Patriot Gym. He is a five-time amateur Muay Thai I.F.M.A world champion and holds a national degree of honored master of sports in Muay Thai. Inside the amateur ring, he enjoyed victories over notable athletes including: Nenad Pagonis, Franci Grajš, Simon Marcus and Vladimir Mineev.

Amateur career

Dzianis has been a prominent member of the Belarusian Muay Thai national team. He won his first major international tournament during his teens, which was the 2006 I.F.M.A World Championships in -81 kg category. In 2006, when Dzianis finished high school, he continued to pursue his Muay Thai career under renowned Belarusian trainer Dmitry Piasetsky. Blood, sweat and tears in this tough training regimen earned him multiple titles from recognized Muay Thai and kickboxing organizations including I.F.M.A and W.A.K.O. Dzianis has had more than 260 amateur fights not only in Thailand, home country of Muay Thai, but all over the world. In 2010, he won the World Combat Games in Beijing, China.

Professional career
Although still competing in international amateur championships as is required of the national team member, Dzianis is very passionate about professional fights. Dzianis has fought 10  professional bouts, chalking up an impressive K.O. victory over Netherlands' Boy Boy Martin on March 19, 2010, in K-1 World Max 2010 East Europe Tournament. 
On July 30, 2011, Dzianis took on Redouan Cairo in Las Vegas, Nevada, United States. The action started immediately and after being knocked down twice in the second round, Hancharonak came back with the TKO in round three.

Twice, Dzianis was meant to take on Australian heavyweight Nathan Corbett: in 2011 when both were in one group in a Muay Thai Premier League tournament, but the promotion group collapsed, and then on March 9, 2013, however the fight never materialized.

There was no winner in a rematch against Redouan Cairo at Kickboxing Empire II in Las Vegas, Nevada, United States on March 8, 2014 as the fight ended up in draw.

He challenged Artem Vakhitov in a fight for the vacant WMC World Heavyweight (-95 kg/209 lb) Championship at Monte Carlo Fighting Masters 2014 in Monte Carlo, Monaco on June 14, 2014, losing a unanimous decision.

Titles

Amateur:
2017 I.F.M.A World Championship in Minsk, Belarus  -91 kg
2016 I.F.M.A World Championship in Jonkoping, Sweden  -91 kg
2014 I.F.M.A World Championship in Langkawi, Malaysia  -91 kg
2013 I.F.M.A European Championship 2013 in Lisbon, Portugal  -91 kg
2012 I.F.M.A World Championship in St. Petersburg, Russia  -91 kg
2012 I.F.M.A European Championship in Antalya, Turkey  -91 kg
2011 I.F.M.A World Championship in Tashkent, Uzbekistan  -91 kg
2011 I.F.M.A European Championship in Antalya, Turkey  -91 kg
2010 I.F.M.A World Championship in Bangkok, Thailand  -91 kg
2009 W.A.K.O. World Championships in Villach, Austria  -86 kg (K-1 Rules)
2009 I.F.M.A World Championship in Bangkok, Thailand  -91 kg
2008 W.A.K.O. European Championships in Oporto, Portugal  −86 kg (K-1 rules)
2008 I.F.M.A World Championship in Bangkok, Thailand  -86 kg
2008 I.F.M.A European Championship in Zgorzelec, Poland  -86 kg
2007 W.M.F European Championship in Vigo, Spain  -81 kg
2006 I.F.M.A World Championship in Bangkok, Thailand  -81 kg
2006 W.A.K.O European Thai-Boxing Championship in Skopje, Macedonia  -81 kg

Fight record

|-
|- bgcolor="#FFBBBB"
| 2016-12-23 || Loss||align=left| Oleh Prymachov || Wu Fight|| Foshan, China || Decision (unanimous) || 3 || 3:00
|-
|- bgcolor="#CCFFCC"
| 2016-08-23 || Win||align=left| Yousri Belgaroui || Akhmat Fight Show || Grozny, Russia || Decision (unanimous) || 3 || 3:00
|-
|- bgcolor="#FFBBBB"
| 2014-06-14 || Loss ||align=left| Artem Vakhitov || Monte Carlo Fighting Masters 2014 || Monte Carlo, Monaco || Decision (unanimous) || 5 || 3:00
|-
! style=background:white colspan=9 |
|-
|- bgcolor="#c5d2ea"
| 2014-03-08 || Draw ||align=left| Redouan Cairo || Kickboxing Empire II || Las Vegas, Nevada, USA || Draw (split) || 5 || 3:00
|-
|- bgcolor="#CCFFCC"
| 2013-01-05 || Win ||align=left| Adrian Cuşnir || Kickboxing Elimination Tournament || Minsk, Belarus || TKO || 1 ||
|-
|- bgcolor="#CCFFCC"
| 2011-07-30 || Win ||align=left| Redouan Cairo || Kickboxing Empire I || Las Vegas, Nevada, USA || KO || 3 || 2:06
|-
|- bgcolor="#CCFFCC"
| 2010-03-19 || Win ||align=left| Boy Boy Martin || K-1 World Max 2010 || Minsk, Belarus || KO || 1 || 1:20

|- bgcolor="#CCFFCC"
| 2007-04-14 || Win ||align=left| Myle Mindaugas ||  Gladiators	 || Estonia || KO || 1 || 
|-
|-
| colspan=9 | Legend:    

|-  style="background:#cfc;"
| 2017-05-12|| Win ||align=left| Jakub Klauda || 2017 IFMA World Championships, Final || Minsk, Belarus || Decision (30:27) || 3 ||3:00 
|-
! style=background:white colspan=9 |

|-  style="background:#cfc;"
| 2017-05-10|| Win ||align=left| Jakob Styben|| 2017 IFMA World Championships, Semi Final || Minsk, Belarus || Decision (30:27) || 3 ||3:00

|-  style="background:#cfc;"
| 2017-05-06|| Win ||align=left| Batmas Olcay  || 2017 IFMA World Championships, Quarter Final || Minsk, Belarus || RSCH || 1 ||

|- bgcolor="#fbb"
| 2016-05- || Loss ||align=left| Oleh Pryimachov || 2016 IFMA World Championships -91 kg, Final || Jonkoping, Sweden || Decision ||3 || 3:00
|-
! style=background:white colspan=9 |

|-  style="background:#fbb;"
| 2015-08- || Loss||align=left| Artem Vakhitov || 2015 IFMA World Championships, Quarter Final || Bangkok, Thailand || Decision || 3 || 3:00

|- bgcolor="#CCFFCC"
| 2014-05-09 || Win ||align=left| Ivan Pentka || 2014 IFMA World Championships -91 kg, Final || Langkawi, Malaysia ||  ||  ||
|-
! style=background:white colspan=9 |
|-
|- bgcolor="#CCFFCC"
| 2014-05-07 || Win ||align=left| Fredy Langawagen|| 2014 IFMA World Championships -91 kg, Semi Finals   || Langkawi, Malaysia || Decision || 4 || 2:00
|-
|- bgcolor="#CCFFCC"
| 2014-05-04 || Win ||align=left| Oleh Pryimachov|| 2014 IFMA World Championships -91 kg, Quarter Finals   || Langkawi, Malaysia || Decision || 4 || 2:00
|-
|- bgcolor="#CCFFCC"
| 2014-05-03 || Win ||align=left| Sergej Maslobojev || 2014 IFMA World Championships -91 kg, Open Round   || Langkawi, Malaysia || TKO (Injury) ||  ||

|-  style="background:#cfc;"
| 2013-07-|| Win ||align=left| Vladimir Mineev || 2013 IFMA European Championship, Final || Lisbon, Portugal || Decision  || 4 || 2:00
|-
! style=background:white colspan=8 |

|-  style="background:#cfc;"
| 2012-09-13||Win||align=left| Yusuf Ibqagimov || 2012 IFMA World Championships, Final || Bangkok, Thailand || Decision || 4 || 2:00
|-
! style=background:white colspan=9 |

|-  style="background:#cfc;"
| 2012-09-11||Win||align=left| Alexander Oleinik || 2012 IFMA World Championships, Semi Final || Bangkok, Thailand || Decision || 4 || 2:00

|-  style="background:#cfc;"
| 2012-05- || Win ||align=left| Dzhavatkhan Atakov || 2012 IFMA European Championships, Final || Antalya, Turkey || Decision || 4 || 2:00
|-
! style=background:white colspan=9 |

|-  bgcolor="#CCFFCC"
| 2011-09-27 || Win ||align=left| Franc Grajs || I.F.M.A. World Championships 2011, Final || Tashkent, Uzbekistan || Decision || 4 || 2:00 
|-
! style=background:white colspan=9 |

|-  bgcolor="#CCFFCC"
| 2011-09-25 || Win ||align=left| Shahram  || I.F.M.A. World Championships 2011, Semi Final || Tashkent, Uzbekistan || Decision || 4 || 2:00 

|-  style="background:#cfc;"
| 2011-04-||Win||align=left| Mehmet Ozer || 2011 IFMA European Championships, Final || Antalya, Turkey || Decision || 4 || 2:00
|-
! style=background:white colspan=9 |

|-  style="background:#cfc;"
| 2011-04-||Win||align=left| Tsotne Rogava|| 2011 IFMA European Championships|| Antalya, Turkey || Decision || 4 || 2:00

|-  style="background:#fbb;"
| 2010-12- || Loss ||align=left| Ondřej Hutník || 2010 I.F.M.A. World Muaythai Championships, Finals || Bangkok, Thailand || ||||
|-
! style=background:white colspan=9 |
|-  style="background:#cfc;"
| 2010-12- || Win||align=left| || 2010 I.F.M.A. World Muaythai Championships, Semi Finals || Bangkok, Thailand || ||||

|-  bgcolor="#CCFFCC"
| 2010-09-02 || Win ||align=left| Wang Wen Zhong || 2010 World Combat Games -91 kg Muay Thai, Final || Beijing, China || Decision (3:2)  || 4 || 2:00 
|-
! style=background:white colspan=9 |
|-  bgcolor="#CCFFCC"
| 2010-09-02 || Win ||align=left| Thor Hoopman || 2010 World Combat Games -91 kg Muay Thai, Semi Final || Beijing, China || Decision  ||  || 

|-  style="background:#cfc;"
| 2009-12-||Win||align=left| Tsotne Rogava|| 2009 IFMA World Championships, Final || Bangkok, Thailand || Decision || 4 || 2:00
|-
! style=background:white colspan=9 |

|- bgcolor="#FFBBBB"
| 2009-10-26 || Loss ||align=left| Nenad Pagonis || W.A.K.O World Championships 2009, K-1 Final -86 kg || Villach, Austria ||  ||  || 
|-
! style=background:white colspan=9 |
|-
|- bgcolor="#CCFFCC"
| 2009-10-24 || Win ||align=left| Radoska Rydzewski || W.A.K.O World Championships 2009, K-1 Semi Finals -86 kg || Villach, Austria ||  ||  || 
|-
|- bgcolor="#CCFFCC"
| 2008-11 || Win ||align=left| Nenad Pagonis || W.A.K.O European Championships 2008, K-1 Final -86 kg  || Porto, Portugal || Decision (Unanimous) || 3 || 2:00
|-
! style=background:white colspan=9 |
|-
|- bgcolor="#CCFFCC"
| 2008-11 || Win ||align=left| Khalid Ismail || W.A.K.O European Championships 2008, K-1 Semi Finals -86 kg  || Porto, Portugal || KO ||  ||
|-
|- bgcolor="#CCFFCC"
| 2008-11 || Win ||align=left| Emanuel Silva || W.A.K.O European Championships 2008, K-1 Quarter Finals -86 kg  || Porto, Portugal || KO ||  ||
|-
|- align="center"  bgcolor=
| 2006-11 || WO ||align=left| Ivan Damianov || W.A.K.O European Championships 2006, Thai-Boxing Rules Final -81 kg || Skopje, Macedonia ||WO (No Fight) || ||
|-
! style=background:white colspan=9 |
|-
|- align="center"  bgcolor="#CCFFCC"
| 2006-11 || Win ||align=left| Dmytro Kirpan || W.A.K.O European Championships 2006, Thai-Boxing Rules Semi Finals -81 kg || Skopje, Macedonia || || ||
|-
|- align="center"  bgcolor="#CCFFCC"
| 2006-11 || Win ||align=left| Nenad Slavkovski || W.A.K.O European Championships 2006, Thai-Boxing Rules Quarter Finals -81 kg || Skopje, Macedonia || KO|| ||
|-
|- align="center"  bgcolor="#CCFFCC"
| 2006-11 || Win ||align=left| Araz Ismayilov || W.A.K.O European Championships 2006, Thai-Boxing Rules First Round -81 kg || Skopje, Macedonia || Decision (Unanimous)|| 3||2:00
|-
|-
| colspan=9 | Legend:

See also
List of male kickboxers
List of K-1 events

References

Belarusian male kickboxers
Heavyweight kickboxers
Belarusian Muay Thai practitioners
Sportspeople from Minsk
1988 births
Living people